The Clutch was an American collective of songwriters and record producers based in Atlanta, consisted of Candice Clotiel "Gg" Nelson, Ezekiel "Zeke" Lewis, Patrick Michael "J. Que" Smith, Balewa Muhammad and Keri Hilson. They are responsible for a series of successful singles including Omarion's "Ice Box", Ciara's "Like a Boy", Timbaland's "The Way I Are", Britney Spears' "Radar" and Justin Bieber's "One Less Lonely Girl".

Any combination of two or more of the five writers on a song is considered a track "written by The Clutch" as they rarely worked as a complete fivesome.

The Clutch launched many successful record producers, including: Calvo Da Gr8 ("Like a Boy"), Bigg D ("Wrong When You're Gone") and most notably Hit-Boy ("Forever", "Hey Young Girl") The Clutch also wrote songs for some of the most successful producers in modern music including Timbaland, Danja, Bryan-Michael Cox, Bloodshy & Avant and Tricky Stewart.

Discography

Singles produced

C Single Release Cancelled

P Promo Only Or Limited Release

BU Reached Only Billboard's Bubbling Under R&B/Hip-Hop Singles Chart

References

African-American record producers
Record producers from Georgia (U.S. state)
African-American songwriters
Writers from Atlanta
Record production teams
American songwriting teams